Count of Monpezat (Danish: Greve af Monpezat) or Countess of Monpezat (Danish: Grevinde af Monpezat) when the holder is female, is a Danish hereditary title of nobility. It was granted on 30 April 2008 by Queen Margrethe II to her two sons, Crown Prince Frederik and Prince Joachim, and their legitimate patrilineal (male-line) descendants of both sexes. The title is based on the French title "Comte de Laborde de Monpezat" which was used by their father Henrik, Prince Consort of Denmark.

The wife of a count has the right to use countess as a courtesy title, but a woman cannot pass the title to her husband or elevate her husband's status. As the title only is passed down the male line, the children of a Countess of Monpezat do not inherit the title, but those children are titled greve (for sons) or komtesse (for unmarried daughters) as a courtesy title.

History

Origins as a French title

The Laborde de Monpezat family style themselves as "comte de Laborde de Monpezat" (in English Count of Laborde of Monpezat) since somewhere late in the nineteenth century. The right to the use of that comital title is disputed; The Encyclopédie de la fausse noblesse et de la noblesse d'apparence states that Prince Henrik's ancestor, Jean Laborde, received royal letters patent of ennoblement in 1655, conditional on his reception as a noble in the Estates of the province of Béarn where his lands were located. But this condition was never fulfilled, as the Estates refused Laborde's petitions in 1703 and again in 1707. The family's surname was "Monpezat" by the time of the French Revolution, without title, until 14 July 1860, when it was changed by imperial decree to "de Laborde-Monpezat", and legally changed again on 19 May 1861 to "de Laborde de Monpezat".

Although the comital title has been used by the family as if it were a courtesy title, traditionally the royal court and French society accepted such titles when used by genuinely noble families. Before his marriage with queen Margrethe II of Denmark, Prince Henrik also used this French comital title.

Danish title
In 2008, the title "Count of Monpezat" (greve af Monpezat), was conferred by the Queen on her and Prince Henrik's two sons, this as a genuine Danish title of nobility and being hereditary to all legitimate descendants in male line. According to historian Jon Bloch Skipper, the title granted in 2008 was unrelated to the original French noble title, but was a reference to Prince Henrik and his French lineage.

 On 28 September 2022, the Royal Household announced that from 1 January 2023, the children of Prince Joachim will no longer be titled Prince or Princess of Denmark, though their place in the line of succession will be unaffected. This would leave Count or Countess of Monpezat as their most senior titles. The children will also lose the style of Highness, and will instead be styled Excellency. Queen Margrethe II said that this would enable her grandchildren to "shape their own lives to a much greater extent without being limited by the special considerations and duties that a formal affiliation with the Royal House of Denmark as an institution involves."

List of Counts of Monpezat
The family tree is based on the current line of succession to the Danish throne.

 Queen Margrethe II (b.1940) ∞ Henrik, Prince Consort (1934–2018)
 (1) Crown Prince Frederik (b. 1968)
 (2) Prince Christian (b. 2005)
 (3) Princess Isabella (b. 2007)
 (4) Prince Vincent (b. 2011)
  (5) Princess Josephine (b. 2011)
  (6) Prince Joachim (b. 1969)
 (7) Count Nikolai (b. 1999)
 (8) Count Felix (b. 2002)
 (9) Count Henrik (b. 2009)
   (10) Countess Athena (b. 2012)

Consequences
Should any of the Princes who are styled Count of Monpezat marry without consent of the Danish monarch, they will lose their dynastic rights but remain Count of Monpezat.

See also
 House of Monpezat
 Danish nobility
 Mountbatten-Windsor

References

Danish royalty
Danish noble titles
House of Monpezat
Noble titles created in 2008
2008 establishments in Denmark